Buttonbush is a common name for several plants and may refer to:

Cephalanthus, a genus of shrubs or small trees in the madder family, Rubiaceae, especially:
Cephalanthus occidentalis, the common Cephalanthus species in eastern North America
Conocarpus, a genus of two species of dense multiple-trunked shrubs or small to medium-sized trees in the family Combretaceae, native to tropical regions